Paolo Morando Cavazzola (1486–1522) was an Italian painter of the Renaissance, active mainly in his hometown of Verona. He appears to have been a pupil of one of the brothers Morone, likely Francesco Morone. He painted in a style resembling that of Giorgione.

References
Review of Cavazzola by Christian Hornig, Rona Goffen. The Art Bulletin, Vol. 62, No. 2 (Jun., 1980), pp. 323–325.
 Web Gallery of Art biography.

1486 births
1522 deaths
15th-century Italian painters
Italian male painters
16th-century Italian painters
Painters from Verona
Italian Renaissance painters